Dimna Lake is an artificial reservoir located near Dalma Wildlife Sanctuary, 15 km from the city of Jamshedpur in the state of Jharkhand. Constructed in 1944, by Tata Steel to deal with the water scarcity in the city.

Geography 
Dimna Lake is situated at the foot of Dalma Hills. Dimna Lake covers about 5.5 km2, around 1,861 acres were acquired under the Land Acquisition Act of 1894 for the dam. The Lake is the only source of drinking water for Jamshedpur town. The lake is near to the Dalma Wildlife Sanctuary.

It is about 100 km from the capital city Ranchi, and 15 km from the steel city Jamshedpur. The total storage capacity of Dimna Lake is about 120 lakh cubic feet. The spread of water in the lake is approximately two square miles. The lake is 3 and a half miles long and about a mile wide. There are two short dams of the composite type, one 800 ft. long and the second 1,200 ft. long. The maximum height of the dam from the lowest level is 83 feet and the maximum width at the bottom is about 400 ft. An outlet with suitable valves is provided and there are pipelines through which water is carried to Jamshedpur. The source of water generation is rainfall. The harvested rainwater majorly supports local community, biodiversity and municipal water demand of Jamshedpur town during monsoon season. Rainwater from an area of about 36 square miles from the hilly terrain flowed into the Dimna Nala. Nature had provided a readymade basin and a range of hills in such a manner that by closing two small gaps, a large quantity of water could be stored.

History 
In the late 1930s, Jamshedpur felt that water scarcity could hit the people of the city as the population was growing rapidly. To deal with the crisis, Dimna Nala Water Supply Scheme was introduced.

Dimna Lake was constructed and owned by Tata Steel in the Boram block. The construction began in February 1940. The project was successfully completed, and water was supplied to the city for the first time on April 17, 1944.

Activities 
Dimna Lake is famous for its serenity and pleasant greenery. The lake is pretty well-known as a picnic spot with its clear water and scenic surroundings, creating scope for mini treks into the hills, and water activities such as boating, rowing, and jet skiing among many others.

Accessibility

See also 

 Dalma Wildlife Sanctuary
 Tata Steel Zoological Park
 Jubilee Park, Jamshedpur
 Rankini Temple, Jadugora

References 

1944 establishments in India
Lakes of Jharkhand
Reservoirs in India
Jamshedpur
Establishments in Bihar
Establishments in Jharkhand
Neighbourhoods in Jamshedpur